Richard de Bures (? – May 1247) may have been seventeenth Grand Master of the Knights Templar, from 1245 to 1247, although many sources make no mention of him. It is possible he simply acted as a Master during Périgord's captivity.

References

1247 deaths
Grand Masters of the Knights Templar
Year of birth unknown
13th-century French people